Hitchin Oughton is one of the five electoral wards in Hitchin, England. It contains the Westmill estate and is named after the River Oughton. It invariably returns a Labour councillor.

References

Areas of Hitchin
Wards of Hertfordshire